Jacob Burns may refer to:

Jacob Burns (attorney) (1902–1993), Russian-born American
Jacob Burns (footballer) (born 1978), Australian football player

See also
Jacob Burns Film Center, a cultural arts center in Pleasantville, New York